Biggs is a Portuguese basic cable and satellite television targeted to children, teens and youth ages 8 to 14. It was launched on 1 December 2009 on the NOS platform. It airs live-action shows, films, anime and cartoon shows. It also used to air archived programs from Canal Panda. Its design is very similar to that of YTV and Disney XD.

On 1 June 2021, it was launched another Portuguese TV channel targeted to children called Panda Kids. It airs almost mostly the anime and cartoon shows formerly aired on Biggs, including new ones and films, some formerly aired on Canal Panda. Initially it was supposed to be the first Portuguese pop-up TV channel for children, but due to the increase of the channel's target audience ratings, Dreamia decided to make it as a regular and permanent channel like Biggs and Canal Panda.

Programming

6Teen
Ace Ventura: Pet Detective
Action Dad
Air Gear
A Penguin's Troubles
Almost Naked Animals
Angry Birds Stella
Angry Birds Toons
A Penguin's Troubles
Backstage
Bakugan: Armored Alliance
Blaze and the Monster Machines
Bakugan Battle Brawlers
Bakugan: Battle Planet
Bakugan: Gundalian Invaders
Bakugan: Mechtanium Surge
Bakugan: New Vestroia
Basketeers (season 2)
Batman of the Future
Batman: The Brave and the Bold
Baxter
B-Daman Crossfire
B-Daman Fireblast
Be the Creature
Being Ian
Best Ed
Beyblade
Beyblade Burst
Beyblade Burst Evolution
Beyblade Burst Rise
Beyblade Burst Turbo
Beyblade G-Revolution
Beyblade: Metal Fury
Beyblade: Metal Fusion
Beyblade: Metal Masters
Beyblade: Shogun Steel
Beyblade Vforce
BeyRaiderz Shogun
BeyWheelz
Blue Dragon
Braceface
Camp Lakebottom
Captain Biceps
Captain Tsubasa (2018 series)
Cardcaptor Sakura
Carl²
Chaotic
Chica Vampiro
Class of the Titans
Clay Kids
Clone High
Club 57
Clue
Code Lyoko Evolution
Code Lyoko
Chuggington
Complete Savages
Connor Undercover
Corrector Yui
Crayon Shin-chan (second Portuguese dub)
Cubix
Dance Academy
Danger Mouse
Dawn of the Croods
Delilah and Julius
Demon Slayer: Kimetsu no Yaiba
Dragons: Race to the Edge
Dragon Ball Super
Doraemon (both the 1979 series and 2005 series and in the Castilian Spanish dub with Portuguese subtitles)
Dork Hunters from Outer Space
Digimon Frontier
Digimon Fusion
Digimon Tamers
Digimon Universe: App Monsters
Dinosaur King
Dinotrux
eBand
Edgar & Ellen
Egyxos
Even Stevens
Family Biz
Fangbone!
Fantastic Four
Fergus McPhail
Fish'n Chips
Football Dream: The Knight in the Area
Formula X
Fort Boyard
Franky Snow
Futz!
Garfield and Friends
Gawayn (season 2)
Get Ace
G-Fighters
G.I. Joe: Renegades
Girlstuff/Boystuff
Go! Live Your Way
Greenhouse Academy
Grossology
H2O: Just Add Water
Hairy Scary
Half Moon Investigations
Hard Out
Hero 108
Home: Adventures with Tip & Oh
Hubert and Takako
Huntik
Inazuma Eleven: Ares
Inazuma Eleven
Inazuma Eleven GO: Chrono Stone
Inazuma Eleven GO Galaxy
Inazuma Eleven GO
Inuyasha
Iron Man: Armored Adventures
Jamie's Got Tentacles
Johnny Test
Justice League Unlimited
Kaeloo
Kally's Mashup
Kamen Rider: Dragon Knight
Kiteretsu
KochiKame (Castilian Spanish with Portuguese subtitles)
Kong: King of the Apes
Kyle XY
League of Super Evil
Lockie Leonard
Lost & Found Music Studios
Magical Doremi (season 3)
Oscar's Oasis
Magi-Nation
Maggie & Bianca: Fashion Friends
Majority Rules!
Martin Mystery
Max Steel
Men in Black: The Series
Mermaid Melody (season 2)
Mix Masters Final Force
Monster Allergy
Monster Rancher
Morangos com Açúcar
Mr. Baby
Mummies Alive!
Mutant Busters
Mushiking: King of the Beetles
My Hero Academia
My Life Me
My Spy Family
Naturally, Sadie
One Piece
Overruled!
Pac-Man and the Ghostly Adventures
Patito Feo
Peanuts
Pet Alien
Pirate Express
Pirate Family
Lanfeust Quest
Lego City
Pokémon Black & White: Adventures in Unova
Pokémon: Black & White: Adventures in Unova and Beyond 
Pokémon: Black and White
Pokémon: Black & White: Rival Destinies
Pokémon: Battle Dimension
Pokémon: Diamond and Pearl
Pokémon: Galactic Battles
Pokémon Journeys: The Series
Pokémon: Sinnoh League Victors
Pokémon: Sun & Moon
Pokémon: Sun & Moon: Ultra Adventures
Pokémon Sun and Moon Ultra Legends
Pokémon XY: Kalos Quest
Pokémon XY
Pokémon XY & Z
Prank Patrol
Starla & the Jewel Riders
Ratz
Redakai: Conquer the Kairu
Sailor Moon Crystal
Saint Seiya Omega
Secret Agent Men
Sgt. Frog (Castilian Spanish with Portuguese subtitles)
SheZow
Skunk Fu!
Sky
Slugterra
Sonic X
Space Goofs
Spider-Man: The New Animated Series
Spider Riders
Stoked
Storm Hawks
Strange Days at Blake Holsey High
Strange Hill High
Super Duper Sumos
Sweet Little Monsters
Sylvester and Tweety Mysteries
Taking The Next Step
Tales from the Cryptkeeper
Talking Tom and Friends
Teenage Mutant Hero Turtles
Teenage Mutant Ninja Turtles
Teen Titans
Teen Wolf
Tenkai Knights
That's So Weird!
The Adventures of Puss in Boots
The Adventures of Rocky and Bullwinkle
The Athena
The Batman
The Deep
The Epic Tales of Captain Underpants
The Future Is Wild
The Looney Tunes Show
The Mojicons
The Next Step (seasons 6, 7 and 8)
The Epic Tales of Captain Underpants
The Mr. Peabody & Sherman Show
The Spectacular Spider-Man
The Wacky World of Tex Avery
Theodosia
Thunderbirds Are Go
ThunderCats
Time Jam: Valerian & Laureline
Titeuf
Total Drama Action
Total Drama Island
Total Drama World Tour
Transformers Animated
Transformers: Prime
Transformers: Rescue Bots
Transformers: Robots in Disguise
Trollhunters: Tales of Arcadia
Tsubasa: Reservoir Chronicle
Turbo FAST
Undergrads
Voltron: Legendary Defender
Viewtiful Joe
What's New, Scooby-Doo?
Wild Grinders
Winston Steinburger & Sir Dudley Ding Dong
Wolverine and the X-Men
World of Quest
World of Winx
Yo soy Franky
Young Dracula
Yvon of the Yukon
Zap Jr. High
Zombie Hotel

External links

Panda Biggs at LyngSat Address

AMC Networks International
Children's television networks
Television stations in Portugal
Television channels and stations established in 2009
2009 establishments in Portugal